Jun Woul-sik (Hangul: 전월식; born 20 July 1980) is a former South Korean badminton player.

Jun was educated at the Seongil Girls' High School. She was part of the national junior team that won the girls' team silver medal at the 1998 Asian Junior Championships, and claimed the individual girls' doubles silver partnered with Lee Hyo-jung. She and Lee also captured the girls' doubles bronze at the World Junior Championships in Australia. Jun won the senior international tournament at the 1997 South Korea and 1998 Sri Lanka International. She also won the women's doubles title at the 2005 Canadian International partnered with Ra Kyung-min.

Jun played for the Daekyo Corporation in the national event, and was the runner-up in the mixed doubles, and the semi-finalist in the women's doubles event at the 2004 National Championships in Seoul. She graduated from the Busan University of Foreign Studies.

Achievements

World Junior Championships
Girls' doubles

Asian Junior Championships 
Girls' doubles

IBF International 
Women's doubles

Mixed doubles

References

External links
 

South Korean female badminton players
Living people
1980 births
21st-century South Korean women